Geology of Georgia may refer to: 

 Geology of Georgia (U.S. state)
 Geology of Georgia (country)